The 2009 McNeese State Cowboys football team represented McNeese State University as a member of the Southland Conference in the 2009 NCAA Division I FCS football season. The Cowboys were led by fourth-year head coach Matt Viator and played their home games at Cowboy Stadium.

Schedule

References

McNeese State
McNeese Cowboys football seasons
Southland Conference football champion seasons
McNeese State Cowboys football